Udsu Lake is a lake of Estonia, located in Jeti village, Tõrva Parish, Valga County. Udsu is one of the deepest lake in Estonia; maximum depth 30.2 m. Udsu surface area is 6.9 ha.

Udsu is oligotrophic lake.

Udsu belongs to Koorküla Nature Reserve.

See also
List of lakes of Estonia

References

Tõrva Parish
Lakes of Valga County